Jim Stark may refer to:

 Jim Stark (Rebel Without a Cause), The protagonist in the film Rebel Without a Cause, played by James Dean
 Jim Stärk, Norwegian pop band

See also
James Stark (disambiguation)